

Talapoins are the two species of Old World monkeys classified in genus Miopithecus. They live in central Africa, with their range extending from Cameroon and the Democratic Republic of the Congo to Angola.

With a typical length of 32 to 45 cm and a weight of approximately 1.3 kg (males) and 0.8 kg (females), the talapoins are the smallest Old World monkeys. Their fur is grey green on top and whitish on their underside, much like the vervet monkeys. The head is round and short-snouted with a hairless face.

Talapoins are diurnal and arboreal, preferring rain forest or mangroves near water. They are usually not found in open fields, nor do they seem to be disrupted by humans. Like Allen's swamp monkey, they can swim well and look in the water for food.

These monkeys live in groups of 60 to 100 individuals. They congregate at night in trees close to the water, dividing into smaller subgroups during the day to spread out to find food. Groups are composed of several fully mature males, numerous females and their offspring. Unlike the closely related guenons, they do not have any territorial behaviors. Their vocal repertoire is smaller, as well.

Talapoins are omnivores; their diet consists mainly of fruits, seeds, aquatic plants, insects, shellfish, bird eggs and small vertebrates.

Their 160-day gestation period (typically from November to March) results in the birth of a single young. Offspring are considerably large and well developed (newborns weigh over 200 g and are about a quarter of the weight of the mother) and develop rapidly. Within six weeks, they eat solid food, and at three months of age, they are independent. The highest recorded age of an animal in captivity was 28 years, while the life expectancy in the wild is not well known.

Species 
Genus Miopithecus

Etymology
Talapoin is a 16th-century French word for a Buddhist monk, from Portuguese talapão, from Mon tala pōi "our lord"; originally jocular, from the appearance of the monkey.

References

External links

 Primate Info Net Miopithecus Factsheets

 01
Primates of Africa
Fauna of Central Africa
Cercopithecini